Buffalo Creek is an unincorporated community in Wayne County, West Virginia, United States.

References

Unincorporated communities in Wayne County, West Virginia

Unincorporated communities in West Virginia